George "Garth" William Hudson (26 October 1923 – 13 August 2014) was an English professional footballer who made 402 appearances in the English Football League playing for Portsmouth and Swindon Town.

References

1923 births
2014 deaths
People from Havant
English footballers
Association football defenders
Portsmouth F.C. players
Swindon Town F.C. players
English Football League players